Trey Thomas Sweeney (born April 24, 2000) is an American professional baseball shortstop for the New York Yankees organization. He played college baseball for the Eastern Illinois Panthers. He was selected in the first round of the 2021 Major League Baseball draft by the Yankees.

Amateur career
Sweeney grew up in Louisville, Kentucky, and attended St. Xavier High School. As a senior, he batted .389 with 41 RBIs and 18 stolen bases as St. Xavier won the state championship. Sweeney committed to play baseball at Eastern Illinois University, which was the only Division I school to offer him a scholarship.

Sweeney played college baseball for the Eastern Illinois Panthers for three seasons. He became a starter as a freshman and was named to the Ohio Valley Conference (OVC) All-Freshman team after batting .266 with 61 total bases, 27 runs scored, and 24 runs batted in (RBIs). After the season, Sweeney played collegiate summer baseball for the Lafayette Aviators of the Prospect League and was named a league All-Star after slashing .354/.453/.524 in 257 plate appearances. He batted .351 as a sophomore before the season was cut short due to the coronavirus pandemic. As a redshirt sophomore, Sweeney was named the OVC Player of the Year after he hit .382 with 14 home runs and 58 RBIs and was a finalist for the Brooks Wallace Award. Due to his performance he became rated as one of the best college batting prospects in the 2021 Major League Baseball draft.

Professional career
Sweeney was selected the 20th overall pick in the 2021 Major League Baseball draft by the New York Yankees. On July 19, 2021, Sweeney signed with the Yankees for a $3 million bonus. He was assigned to the Rookie-level Florida Complex League Yankees to start his professional career and was later promoted to the Tampa Tarpons of the Low-A Southeast. Over 32 games between the two teams, Sweeney slashed .261/.384/.584 with seven home runs and 14 RBIs. He opened the 2022 season with the Hudson Valley Renegades of the High-A South Atlantic League. Sweeney was promoted to the Double-A Somerset Patriots after batting .241 with 14 home runs and 51 RBIs in 100 games played with Hudson Valley.

References

External links

Eastern Illinois Panthers bio

Eastern Illinois Panthers baseball players
Baseball players from Louisville, Kentucky
Baseball shortstops
Living people
2000 births
Florida Complex League Yankees players
Tampa Tarpons players
Hudson Valley Renegades players
Somerset Patriots players